The Little School Ma'am is a 1916 American drama silent black and white film directed by C.M. Franklin and S.A. Franklin, and written by Bernard McConville and Frank E. Woods. It stars Dorothy Gish.

Cast
 Dorothy Gish as Nan
 Elmer Clifton as Wilbur Howard
 George C. Pearce as Squire Tolliver
 Jack Brammall as Jim Tolliver
 Howard Gaye as Old Man Tyler
 Josephine Crowell as Widow Larkin
 Luray Huntley as Sally
 Millard Webb as Jebb
 Hal Wilson as Washington
 Georgie Stone as Billy
 Francis Carpenter as One of the Children
 'Baby' Carmen De Rue as One of the Children
 Violet Radcliffe as One of the Children

References

External links
 

Silent American drama films
1916 drama films
1916 films
American silent feature films
American black-and-white films
Films directed by Chester Franklin
Films directed by Sidney Franklin
Films directed by Millard Webb
Films with screenplays by Bernard McConville
Films with screenplays by Frank E. Woods
Triangle Film Corporation films
Films shot in Los Angeles
Films about teacher–student relationships
1910s American films